Zoe Aldcroft (born 19 November 1996) is an English rugby union player. She represents England women's national rugby union team internationally and made her debut in 2016 against France. She was named in the 2017 Women's Rugby World Cup squad for England. In 2021, Aldcroft was named World Rugby Women’s 15s Player of the Year.

International career 
Aldcroft's first full England cap came in the final four minutes of the England women's national rugby team's game against France in July 2016: she scored the try that won England victory.

She was offered a full-time contract by the RFU in January 2019.

Due to injury, Aldcroft missed the entire 2019 Women's Six Nations Championships but returned to play in the 2019 Super Series in San Diego.

She was part of the 2020 Women's Six Nations England team and was named the 2020 Rugby Players’ Association Telegraph Women’s Sport England player of the year.

In April 2021, she was named Player of the Match after England's Six Nations victory over France.

On the 10 December 2021 Zoe Aldcroft was crowned World Rugby Women’s 15s Player of the Year 2021, with the following citation 'Named England captain for the first time on her 25th birthday, Zoe Aldcroft led the Red Roses to an 89-0 victory over the USA and marked the occasion with a try. Aldcroft started all eight of England’s matches in 2021 as the Red Roses extended their unbeaten run to 18 tests and won a third successive Women’s Six Nations title.' 

She was named in the England squad for the delayed 2021 Rugby World Cup held in New Zealand in October and November 2022.

Club career 
Previously a student at Hartpury College, Aldcroft signed for Gloucester-Hartpury Women's from Darlington Mowden Park ahead of the 2017-18 season: she missed her first season due to an ankle injury. In 2018, she returned to Gloucester-Hartpury to captain the side in the Tyrrells Premier 15s.

Early life and education 
Aldcroft started playing rugby at Scarborough, when she was nine. Her brother Jonathan also played for Scarborough. She also played netball and studied dance and ballet until she was 15, which she credits with giving her unique skills that she has brought to her rugby game.

She went on to play for Malton girls, West Park Leeds and Hartpury University R.F.C., and represented Yorkshire at U15 level.

She was a member of the England U18 Sevens team that became the inaugural European champions in Sweden. Aldcroft was educated at St Martin’s Church of England School and Scalby School, before studying Sport and Exercise Nutrition at Hartpury College and completing a BSc (Hons) Sport and Exercise Sciences degree. She plans to study chiropody to prepare her for a post-rugby career.

Aldcroft has a knitted doll of England rugby star Jonny Wilkinson that she takes with her to every match.

Life outside rugby 
Zoe appeared on  A Question of Sport season 52 episode 3 alongside host Paddy McGuinness and team captains Sam Quek and Ugo Monye as well as other guests, boxing star Conor Benn, England footballer Andros Townsend and world swimming champion Fran Halsall

References

External links 

 RFU Player Profile

1996 births
Living people
England women's international rugby union players
English female rugby union players
Rugby union players from Scarborough, North Yorkshire